SS-36, SS 36 or SS36 may refer to:

 In military 

 BAP Arica (SS-36), a submarine of the Peruvian Navy commissioned in 1970 and currently in service
 USS K-5 (SS-36), a submarine of the United States Navy which saw service during World War I

 In transportation 

 SS36, a road in Italy

and also:

 USS S-36 (SS-141), a submarine of the United States Navy which saw service during the 1920s